The Tarnaka Metro Station is located on the Blue Line of the Hyderabad Metro. Many taxi and bike rental services are available. There are free metro feeder services from Tarnaka metro station to ECIL.

History 
It opened in 2017.

References

Hyderabad Metro stations
2017 establishments in Telangana
Railway stations in India opened in 2017